Layo District is one of eight districts in the Canas Province in Peru. The seat of the Layo District is the village Layo.

Geography 
The La Raya mountain range traverses the district. Some of the highest mountains of the district are listed below:

Ethnic groups 
The people in the district are mainly indigenous citizens of Quechua descent. Quechua is the language which the majority of the population (90.47%) learnt to speak in childhood, 9.39% of the residents started speaking using the Spanish language (2007 Peru Census).

Sources